Dejan Stošić (born 6 January 1970) is a politician in Serbia. He has served in the National Assembly of Serbia since 2020 as a member of the Serbian Progressive Party.

Early life and career
Stošić was born in Smederevo, in what was then the Socialist Republic of Serbia in the Socialist Federal Republic of Yugoslavia. He has a master's degree in economy and has served as president of FK Smederevo 1924.

Politician

Municipal politics
Stošić joined the Progressive Party in 2009 and appeared in the fiftieth position on the party's electoral list for the Smederevo municipal assembly in the 2012 Serbian local elections. The list won nine seats, and he was not returned. He was promoted to the seventeenth position on the party's list for the 2016 local elections and was elected when the list won a majority victory with forty-four out of seventy seats. On 25 March 2019, he was appointed as the city's deputy mayor.

For the 2020 local elections, Stošić was given the fourth position on the Progressive Party's list and was elected to a second term when the list won forty-six mandates.

Parliamentarian
Stošić received the 172nd position on the Progressive Party's Aleksandar Vučić — For Our Children list in the 2020 Serbian parliamentary election and was elected when the list won a landslide majority with 188 out of 250 mandates. He is a member of the committee on human and minority rights and gender equality, a deputy member of the committee on Kosovo-Metohija and the health and family committee, and a member of the parliamentary friendship groups with Austria, the Bahamas, Belarus, Bosnia and Herzegovina, Botswana, Bulgaria, Cameroon, the Central African Republic, China, Comoros, the Czech Republic, the Dominican Republic, Ecuador, Equatorial Guinea, Eritrea, Germany, Greece, Grenada, Guinea-Bissau, Hungary, Italy, Jamaica, Kyrgyzstan, Laos, Liberia, Madagascar, Mali, Mauritius, Montenegro, Mozambique, Nauru, Nicaragua, Nigeria, Palau, Papua New Guinea, Paraguay, the Republic of Congo, Romania, Saint Vincent and the Grenadines, São Tome and Príncipe, Slovakia, Slovenia, the Solomon Islands, South Sudan, Sri Lanka, Sudan, Suriname, Togo, Trinidad and Tobago, the United Kingdom, the United States of America, Uruguay, and Uzbekistan.

References

1970 births
Living people
Politicians from Smederevo
Members of the National Assembly (Serbia)
Serbian Progressive Party politicians